Patrick Lancereau (born July 18, 1966 in Tours) is a French sprint canoer who competed in the early to mid-1990s. Competing in two Summer Olympics, he earned his best finish of fifth in the K-2 1000 m event at Atlanta in 1996.

References
 Sports-Reference.com profile

1966 births
Canoeists at the 1992 Summer Olympics
Canoeists at the 1996 Summer Olympics
French male canoeists
Living people
Olympic canoeists of France
Sportspeople from Tours, France
20th-century French people